Chumba is a type of Garifuna music.

Chumba may also refer to:
 Chumba, Tibet, a village
 Chumbawamba, a British band
Dickson Chumba (born 1986), Kenyan marathon runner
Sammy Chumba (born 1978), two-time winner of the 20 Kilomètres de Paris

See also
Kipchumba, Kenyan name meaning "son of Chumba"

Kalenjin names